Richard Wilson (5 October 1759 – 7 June 1834) was an English politician who served as  Member of Parliament (MP) for Ipswich from 1806 to 1807.

Sources

Members of the Parliament of the United Kingdom for English constituencies
1759 births
1834 deaths
Members of the Parliament of the United Kingdom for Ipswich
UK MPs 1806–1807